John Francis Joiner (19 June 1934 – 6 October 2021) was an Australian rules footballer who played with North Melbourne in the Victorian Football League (VFL).

Notes

External links 

1934 births
2021 deaths
Australian rules footballers from Victoria (Australia)
North Melbourne Football Club players